Peabody–Burns USD 398 is a public unified school district headquartered in Peabody, Kansas, United States.  The district includes the communities of Peabody, Burns, Wonsevu, and nearby rural areas of Marion, Chase, Harvey and Butler Counties.

History
In its early history, it was sometimes referred as district 12 of Marion County.

In 1945, the School Reorganization Act in Kansas caused the consolidation of thousands of rural school districts in Kansas.  

In 1946-1947, many one-room rural schools consolidated into the Peabody school district.

In 1963, the School Unification Act in Kansas caused the further consolidatation of thousands of tiny school districts into hundreds of larger Unified School Districts.

In 1964, School District 131 was formed by the merger of the former Peabody, Burns, and Summit school districts into one educational system.  The first school board consisted of C. Irvin Good of Peabody, Rodney E. Vogelman of Burns, Sherwin C. Ammeter of Summit.  On July 1, 1965, the school district was approved by the state to become Unified School District (USD) 398.

Current schools

The school district operates the following schools:
 Peabody-Burns Junior/Senior High School at 810 North Sycamore Street in Peabody.  In 1953 the Brown Building was built, in 1997 the current school addition was built south of it.
 Peabody-Burns Elementary School at 506 North Elm Street in Peabody.  The school district headquarters is located in the west side of this building.  It was built in 1974.

Closed schools
 Peabody High School, northeast corner of 8th and Walnut in Peabody.  It was a two story brick building that opened in 1923.  It was closed after the current high school addition was built in 1997 then demolished and converted into a football practice field.
 Peabody Elementary School, northeast corner of 2nd and Maple in Peabody.  It was a large two story limestone building.  It was closed after the current elementary school was built in 1974 then demolished.  It was started in 1872 as two stone rooms, then expanded over decades to its final size.
 Burns High School, southeast corner of Main and Cincinnati in Burns.  It was closed in 1965 then converted into the Burns Community Museum.
 Burns Elementary School, southwest corner of Main and Church in Burns.  It was closed in 1997 then demolished.
 Summit School (rural), along Vista Road between Peabody and Burns.  It was closed in 1965 then demolished.

High School Principals

District Superintendents
Decades ago, Superintendents use to teach class in addition to their administrative roles.  The notes columns lists other jobs held within the same school district (not exhaustive, and may be missing some information).

Neighboring school districts
The neighboring school districts to USD 398 are:
 Remington USD 206 - south of USD 398
 Newton USD 373 - southwest
 Goessel USD 411 - west
 Hillsboro USD 410 - northwest
 Marion–Florence USD 408 - north
 Chase County USD 284 - northeast
 Flinthills USD 492 - southeast
 El Dorado USD 490 - southeast

See also
 Peabody City Park, location of football field
 Peabody Gazette-Bulletin, local newspaper, contains stories about USD 398 school district
 List of high schools in Kansas
 List of unified school districts in Kansas
 Kansas State Department of Education
 Kansas State High School Activities Association

References

Further reading

 The Women of Peabody; Peabody Historical Society; Mennonite Press in Newton, KS; 250 pages; 2010; LCCN 2010928692. (contains memories from some former school teachers)
 Peabody : The First 100 Years; Peabody Historical Society; Peabody Gazette-Herald in Peabody, KS; 123 pages; 1971. (contains school history)

External links
 

School districts in Kansas
Education in Marion County, Kansas
School districts established in 1965
1965 establishments in Kansas